This is a chronological list of players from Jamaica who have played in Major League Baseball.

Players

Resource

 
Jamaica
 
Baseball players